The 2009 NAIA football season was the component of the 2009 college football season organized by the National Association of Intercollegiate Athletics (NAIA) in the United States. The season's playoffs, known as the NAIA Football National Championship, culminated with the championship game on December 19, at Barron Stadium in Rome, Georgia.

Conference standings

Postseason

Rankings

References